Koos Jeroen Kers (born 11 October 1986) is a Dutch racing cyclist, who currently rides for Dutch amateur team TWC de Kempen.

He won the first stage of the 2017 Tour of Iran (Azerbaijan). This win made him the general classification leader, but he lost the lead on the next stage. He also had top-ten finishes on the third and sixth stages. The first stage win was his first professional victory, and the second year in a row a Dutchman won a stage of the Tour of Azerbaijan (Iran).

Major results

2011
 7th Grand prix de Khouribga, Challenge des phosphates
2012
 3rd Overall Tour of Fuzhou
 5th Overall Tour de Filipinas
 5th Overall Grand Prix Chantal Biya
2013
 3rd Overall Tour of Fuzhou
 5th Tour de Okinawa
2015
 3rd Omloop der Kempen
 4th Parel van de Veluwe
 8th Overall Tour of Al Zubarah
2017
 1st Stage 1 Tour of Iran (Azerbaijan)
 2nd Tour de Okinawa
2018
 3rd Rutland–Melton CiCLE Classic
 5th Overall Grand Prix Chantal Biya

References

External links

1986 births
Living people
Dutch male cyclists
Sportspeople from Amstelveen
Cyclists from North Holland